Canada has competed at 23 Summer Olympic Games, missing only the inaugural 1896 Summer Olympics and the boycotted 1980 Summer Olympics. The nation made its debut at the 1900 Summer Olympics. Canada competes under the IOC country code CAN.

Canada has hosted the Summer Olympic Games once, in 1976 in Montreal, Quebec and the Winter Olympic Games twice, in Calgary, Alberta in 1988 and Vancouver, British Columbia in 2010.

Medal tables

Medals by year

Canada also won 1 gold medal and 1 silver medal at the 1906 Summer Olympics, which the IOC no longer recognizes as an official Olympic games, so those medals are not counted in this table.

Medals by sport

*One of Canada's Ice Hockey gold medals was won during the 1920 Summer Olympics. This table does not include this medal, resulting in the discrepancy between the medals by games and medals by sports tables.

Canada has never won an Olympic medal in the following current summer sports or disciplines: Archery, Badminton, Baseball, 3-on-3 basketball, BMX freestyle, BMX racing, Canoeing and kayaking (slalom), Fencing, Field hockey, Greco-Roman wrestling, Handball, Indoor Volleyball, Karate, Modern pentathlon, Skateboarding, Sport climbing, Surfing, Table tennis, and Water polo.

Aquatics

Diving

Canada's only gold medal in diving was won by Sylvie Bernier in Los Angeles. At the 2012 Olympics, Émilie Heymans became the first Canadian Summer Olympian to win a medal in four straight Olympics.

Swimming

After George Hodgson won two gold medals in the 1912 Stockholm games, it would be 72 years before Alex Baumann became the second Canadian swimmer to win Olympic gold, when he won both individual medley events in world record time in the 1984 Los Angeles games.  Victor Davis (1984), Anne Ottenbrite (1984), Mark Tewksbury (1992), Penny Oleksiak (2016) and Maggie Mac Neil (2020) are the only other Canadian swimmers to win gold medals.  In 2004, Canada failed to win a medal of any colour in swimming for the first time in 40 years. At the Tokyo Olympics, Penny Oleksiak became the most decorated Canadian Olympian of all time, winning a total of 7 medals.

Marathon swimming

Canada has only won an Olympic medal in marathon swimming once, a bronze by Richard Weinberger in 2012.

Artistic swimming

Canada has been very successful in synchronized swimming at the Olympics, winning medals at every games in which the sport was competed except for 2004 & 2008.

Water polo

Canada has never won an Olympic medal in water polo.  Their best finish was fifth in the women's tournament at the 2000 games.

Archery

Canada has never won an Olympic medal in archery.  Their best finish was fifth in the women's individual competition at the 1976 games.

Athletics

Canada is not traditionally strong in athletics, but the nation has won medals in 15 of 23 games in which it has competed.  Some memorable performances are the double gold by Percy Williams in the 100m and 200m in the 1928 Amsterdam games, and the gold medals won in Atlanta (1996) by Donovan Bailey in the 100m (in world record time) and by the men's 4 × 100 m relay team.

In 2020 Canada originally took the bronze place at the men's 4x100m relay event. After a positive doping test by the silver medallist Great Britain, the IOC disqualified the team.  As a result, Canada's result was upgraded to a silver medal.

Canada also won 1 gold medal and 1 silver medal in Athletics at the 1906 Summer Olympics, which are not counted in this table.

Badminton

Canada has never won an Olympic medal in badminton, since its introduction in 1992.  Their best finish was fourth in the women's doubles competition at the 2012 games.

Baseball and Softball

Baseball

Canada has never won an Olympic medal in baseball.  Their best finish was fourth at the 2004 games.

Softball

Canada has won one Olympic medal in softball, a bronze in the women's tournament at the 2020 games.

Basketball

Basketball

Canada has only won an Olympic medal in basketball once, a silver in 1936.

3-on-3 basketball

Canada has never won an Olympic medal in 3-on-3 basketball since its introduction to the Olympics in 2020.  They have never participated in the event.

Boxing

Canada has enjoyed modest success in Olympic boxing, winning medals in eight games.  Lennox Lewis won the super heavyweight gold medal in Seoul, before competing for his native Great Britain as a professional.

Canoeing and kayaking

Slalom
Canada has never won an Olympic medal in a whitewater event.  Their best finish was fourth in the men's K-1 competition at the 2004 games.

Sprint
Adam van Koeverden and Caroline Brunet are recent multiple medal winners for Canada.

Cycling

Two Canadians have won gold medals in cycling: Lori-Ann Muenzer at the 2004 Summer Olympics in Athens, and Kelsey Mitchell at the 2020 Summer Olympics in Tokyo. Another Canadian cyclist of note is Clara Hughes, double bronze medalist in Atlanta (1996). She has also won medals in the 2002 and 2006 Winter Olympics in speed skating, and is the only Olympian to win multiple medals in both the summer and winter games.

BMX racing
Canada has never won an Olympic medal in a BMX racing event since its introduction to the Olympics in 2008.  Its best finish was fifth in the men's competition at the 2016 games.

BMX freestyle
Canada has never won an Olympic medal in a BMX freestyle event since its introduction to the Olympics in 2020.  They have never participated in the event.

Mountain Biking

Road Cycling

Track Cycling

Equestrian

Canada's first gold medal in equestrian events was won by the show jumping team in Mexico City. A second gold medal, and the first in an individual event, went to Eric Lamaze at the 2008 Beijing Olympics.

Dressage

Eventing

Jumping

Fencing

Canada has never won an Olympic medal in fencing.  Their best finish was fourth in the men's team épée competition at the 1984 games and the women's team épée competition at the 2004 games.

Golf

Golf was only included in the Olympic program for the 1900 and 1904 games, at which George Lyon won the individual gold medal.

Gymnastics

Canada has only won a single medal in artistic gymnastics, a gold by Kyle Shewfelt in Athens.  Lori Fung won a gold in rhythmic gymnastics in Los Angeles and Canadians have also won medals in trampolining.

Artistic

Rhythmic

Trampoline

Handball

Canada has never won an Olympic medal in handball.  Their best finish was sixth in the women's tournament at the 1976 games.

Field hockey

Canada has never won an Olympic medal in field hockey.  Their best finish was fifth in the women's tournament at the 1984 games.

Ice hockey

Canada won the gold medal when ice hockey was introduced in the program of the 1920 Olympics in Antwerp.  The sport was moved to the Winter Olympics program for the first winter games in 1924.

Judo

Canada has won 5 medals in Judo at the Olympics. Antoine Valois-Fortier won bronze at the 2012 Summer Olympics in London. Most recently, Jessica Klimkait and Catherine Beauchemin-Pinard won bronze at the 2020 Summer Olympics in Tokyo.

Karate

Canada has never won an Olympic medal in karate.  Their best finish was seventh at the men's +75 kg competition at the 2020 games.

Lacrosse

Lacrosse was only part of the Olympic program in the 1904 and 1908 games; Canadian teams won the gold medal each time.  In 1904, a second Canadian team, composed only of Mohawk players, also won a bronze medal.

Modern pentathlon

Canada has never won an Olympic medal in modern pentathlon.  Their best finish was eleventh in the men's team competition at the 1988 games and the women's competition at the 2012 games.

Rowing

Rowing is one of Canada's most successful sports at the summer Olympics.  The pair of Marnie McBean and Kathleen Heddle won gold in both the Barcelona (1992) and Atlanta (1996) games.   Canada has traditionally done well in the coxed eights event, with the men's team winning a medal 9 times and the women's team winning a medal 4 times.

Rugby

Canada never qualified a rugby union team for an Olympic games prior to its removal from the program in 1924.  The women's rugby sevens team won a bronze at the 2016 games in the sport's first games on the program.

Sailing

Canada's most notable event in Olympic sailing competition was from the 1988 Seoul games, where Lawrence Lemieux was racing towards a certain medal finish, but stopped to help two Singaporean sailors whose boat had capsized during the race.  Lemieux was later presented an award from IOC president Juan Antonio Samaranch to honor his act of bravery.

Shooting

Linda Thom's gold medal in the 1984 Los Angeles games was the first summer Olympic gold medal for Canada in 16 years, having been shut out in Munich (1972) and Montreal (1976), and boycotting the Moscow (1980) games.  Since her victory was unexpected, and the sport is not very popular, the event was not broadcast live and Canadian television crews had to scramble to put taped images on the air.

Skateboarding

Canada has never won an Olympic medal in skateboarding.  Their best finish was tenth at the men's street competition at the 2020 games.

Soccer

Canada first competed in Olympic football at the second tournament, 1904.  One club team from Canada went to St. Louis to compete against two American teams, winning the gold medal. Canada's men's soccer team is considered unlikely to qualify for the Olympics. The women's national team won the bronze medal in the 2012 and 2016 Olympics and won the gold at the 2020 Olympics in Tokyo.

Sport climbing

Canada has never won an Olympic medal in sport climbing.  Their best finish was 14th at the women's combined competition at the 2020 games.

Surfing

Canada has never won an Olympic medal in surfing.  They have never participated in the event.

Table tennis

Canada has never won an Olympic medal in table tennis since its introduction in the 1988 games.  Their best finish was fifth in the men's singles tournament at the 1996 games.

Taekwondo

Dominique Bosshart won a bronze medal when the sport of taekwondo was introduced at the 2000 Sydney games. Karine Sergerie won silver in the 67 kilogram event, achieving Canada's best-ever finish in taekwondo at the Olympic Games.

Tennis

Canada's lone medal in Olympic tennis was the surprising victory by the men's doubles team of Sébastien Lareau and Daniel Nestor, who beat the home favourite Australian team in the 2000 Sydney games.

Triathlon

Simon Whitfield won the gold medal when triathlon was introduced at the 2000 Sydney games. After an 11th-place finish at the 2004 Athens games, Whitfield returned to take the silver medal at the 2008 Beijing games. Whitfield was nudged out at the end of the race for the gold medal.

Volleyball
Canada's lone medal in volleyball was won by the beach volleyball team of John Child and Mark Heese when the event was introduced as a medal sport at the 1996 Atlanta games.

Beach

Indoor

Canada has never won an Olympic medal in indoor volleyball.  Their best finish was fourth in the men's tournament at the 1984 games.

Weightlifting

Canada's medals in weightlifting were won by Gerald Gratton in 1952, Jacques Demers in 1984, and Christine Girard in 2008 and 2012. In 2008 Christine Girard originally took fourth place at women's 63 kg weightlifting event. After a positive doping test by the silver medallist the IOC disqualified her, and Girard's result was retroactively upgraded to a bronze. In 2012 Christine Girard originally won the bronze medal at women's 63 kg weightlifting event. After a positive doping tests by the gold and silver medallists the IOC disqualified them, and Girard's result was retroactively upgraded to a gold.

Wrestling

Canada's three gold medals in wrestling were won by Daniel Igali in the 2000 Sydney games, Carol Huynh in the 2008 Beijing games in freestyle and Erica Wiebe in the 2016 Rio de Janeiro games in freestyle.

Freestyle

Greco-Roman
Canada has never won an Olympic medal in Greco-Roman wrestling.  Their best finish was fourth in the men's light heavyweight competition at the 1956 games.

See also

 List of Canadian Summer Olympics gold medallists
 Canada at the Winter Olympics
 Own the Podium - Canada's government-sponsored program to win more medals

References

External links
 
 
 

 

no:Canada under Sommer-OL 2012